Bijoy Krishna Girls' College is a women's college in Howrah, India. The college offers undergraduate and postgraduate degrees and is affiliated to University of Calcutta. It is the sole girls' college in Howrah district. Formerly it was Howrah Girls' College. Presently, this college has 27 undergraduate along with 5 postgraduate departments.

History
The college was founded on 1 August 1947 by Bijoy Krishna Bhattacharya, a professor, Indian independence activist and social worker to promote and provide higher education for women. Bengali poet Jibanananda Das and Bengali novelist Bani Basu both were the professors of this college.

Location
This college is located in the heart of the city and just in the vicinity of Howrah Junction railway station. Howrah known as twin city to Kolkata, located on the west bank of holy Ganges river. The Bhāgirathi-Hooghly river, called 'Ganga' or Ganges traditionally, is very close to the college. Nabanna (building), the new State Secretariat of West Bengal is situated in Howrah and also close to the college.

Communication and Transportation
This college is well communicated with Kolkata city and other parts of India through railways and roads. It is also well communicated with launch service from Howrah Ferry Ghat. The nearest railway station is Howrah Junction railway station. It is also easy accessible from Sealdah railway station, Santragachi Junction railway station and Kolkata Railway Station. The Kolkata Metro Line 2 or East West Metro Corridor, which is under construction, within a walking distance from the college. The nearest international and domestic airport is Netaji Subhas Chandra Bose International Airport. Howrah Maidan bus depot is just a walking distance. Besides Bankim Setu is a flyover, which connects the college with rest of Kolkata and Howrah district as buses are available here also.

Accreditation
This college is National Council for Teacher Education (NCTE) approved and National Assessment and Accreditation Council (NAAC) accredited college with Colleges with Potential for Excellence (UGC-CPE) status.

In 2021, the college has re-accredited with Grade "B++" by the National Assessment and Accreditation Council (NAAC).

Facilities
The college consists of a Library and Computer Laboratories, National Service Scheme (NSS) unit, Academy of Competitive Examination unit, career oriented Add-on Courses, Placement unit, Kanyashree Prakalpa, own Gymnasium, Eco-club and many more. The college also consists of a Psychological Counselling Cell – "Aalo" (English: The Light). This college has own girls' hostel "Banalata" (inspired from Bengali poem Banalata Sen) and a well equipped auditorium "Jibanananda Sabhaghar". The college has a study centre for IGNOU. The college has two well hygienic canteens, a tea club for tea lovers along with a cafeteria.

This college has a number of UGC-sponsored career oriented Add-on Diploma Courses for students which they opt along with their regular undergraduate and postgraduate courses: e-Commerce; Computer Data Care Management; Industrial Microbiology; Food and Nutrition; Career Counselling; Functional English; Insurance Management.

The college has a strong Alumni Association – "Punornaba", where a good number of alumni members are actively participated and arranged various programmes on different occasions.

Undergraduate departments

Teachers training

BEd (Bachelor of Education)

Science

Botany 
Chemistry 
Computer Science 
Economics 
Electronics
Environmental Science
Geography
Mathematics
Microbiology
Physics
Psychology
Statistics
Zoology

Commerce
Accountancy

Arts

Bengali
English
Hindi
Urdu
Education
History
Journalism and Mass Communication 
Music
Philosophy
Political Science
Sanskrit
Sociology

Postgraduate Departments

Geography (MSc/M.A.)
Philosophy (M.A.)
Sanskrit (M.A.)
Bengali (M.A.)
Commerce (M.Com)

Notable faculties
Jibanananda Das, Bengali poet & writer
Bani Basu, Bengali novelist

Notable alumni
Anjana Basu, Actress

See also 
List of colleges affiliated to the University of Calcutta
Education in India
Education in West Bengal

References

External links
 Official Website of Bijoy Krishna Girls' College

University of Calcutta affiliates
Educational institutions established in 1947
Women's universities and colleges in West Bengal
Universities and colleges in Howrah district
Education in Howrah
1947 establishments in India